E.J. Noble Hospital is one of a series of names used by three medical facilities in New York (state) that have since become part of St. Lawrence Health System. These facilities, and a foundation, are named after Edward John Noble.

History

E.J. Noble Hospital opened its doors in 1952" in Canton. When this location closed as a hospital, its name was EJ Noble of Canton.

A second Noble Hospital location was in Alexandria Bay, and its names had included Edward John Noble Samaritan.

A third was the Noble hospital in Gouverneur, New York.

A New York State database lists these hospitals as closed, yet as of 2020, the above are still operating under the St. Laurence/EJ Noble/Gouverneur names as medical facilities/doctor offices. Kinney Nursing Home is part of the EJ Noble facilities.

The American Hospital Directory shows only the following certified hospitals: Gouverneur Hospital in Gouverneur, River Hospital in Alexandria Bay, and  Canton-Potsdam Hospital in Potsdam.

E.J. Noble Samaritan
During the 2010s, when Noble had some financial difficulties, Samaritan Medical Center was supervising some of their units, and the name E.J. Noble Samaritan was temporarily used for Noble.

References

  

Defunct hospitals in New York (state)